The following is a comparison of RSS feed aggregators. Often e-mail programs and web browsers have the ability to display RSS feeds. They are listed here, too.

Many BitTorrent clients support RSS feeds for broadcasting (see Comparison of BitTorrent clients).

With the rise of cloud computing, some cloud based services offer feed aggregation. They are listed here as well.

Release history

Netscape Messenger 9 is a fork of Mozilla Thunderbird and has the same features.

Operating system support

Web feed and protocol support

Interface and notes
Web browsers and Internet suites have for browser plugin a N/A, because they don't need it.

Capabilities

See also
 Comparison of email clients
 Comparison of web browsers

Notes

References

External links
 

Feed aggregators